Classic International Cruises was a British-Australian owned shipping company operating five luxury cruise ships, most notably their flagship, the rebuilt ocean liner MS Athena.  The company only operated cruise ships that are former ocean liners, the classic ships of their day (hence the company's name).

History

Classic International Cruises was seemingly founded in 1985, with the purchase of the MV Funchal as the Arcalia Shipping Company Ltd, which eventually became Classic International.  They operated the one ship until 1994, when they bought the Princess  Danae. The Princess Danae entered service with an all-white hull and a sailing ship logo on her funnel. Funchal was given a yellow and blue striped funnel and a white hull, but by 2000 her livery was changed to what now all Classic International ships have. Since 2000 they have purchased 3 ships, Arion, Athena and Princess Daphne, the near-identical sister of Princess Danae. With their main headquarters in Lisbon, Portugal, the company also has several branches based in Paris, France, Piraeus, Greece, Neutral Bay, Australia, Stockholm, Sweden, and London, England.

Due to unpaid bills by the line, the company's four ships, Princess Danae, Princess Daphne, Athena & Arion have all been arrested, the only ship not arrested is the Funchal which is laid up pending refurbishment for SOLAS.

On 20 December 2012, it was resolved to place the company into liquidation.

In the beginning of 2013, the recently created cruise company Portuscale Cruises, led by the Portuguese entrepreneur Rui Alegre, bought Princess Danae, Athena, Arion and Funchal, assuming as well the liabilities of Classic International Cruises.

Ships

References

Defunct companies based in London
Defunct cruise lines
Defunct shipping companies of Australia
Defunct shipping companies of the United Kingdom